The Trofeo Ciudad de Zaragoza is a friendly football tournament organized by Real Zaragoza first played in 1971 and contested every year since.

History

Spanish football friendly trophies
Real Zaragoza
1971 establishments in Spain